Veettoda Mappillai is a 2001 Tamil language comedy film written and directed by V. Sekhar. The film stars Napoleon and Roja, while Vijayakumar, Charle, Vaiyapuri, Kalpana, Kovai Sarala, and Thalaivasal Vijay play supporting roles. It was released on 14 September 2001 to positive reviews.

Plot

Kandaswamy, a restaurant owner, has a son Muthupandi and three daughters: Meena, Jamuna, and Rani. When Muthupandi was young, he fought with his father, cut his father's hand with a knife, and ran away to Mumbai. Kandaswamy brings up his daughters alone. His elder two daughters marry his relatives Ganga and Dhamu, two jobless and lazy sons-in-law. Manikkam, a jobless young graduate, is hired by Kandaswamy. Manikkam works sincerely, and Kandaswamy decides to marry Meena to him. He requests to Manikkam that the couple must stay with him. Manikkam accepts, then he and Meena get married. Meanwhile, Ganga and Dhamu begin a company with their wives' jewels, but it is bankrupt. Muthupandi, a hotel owner in Mumbai, comes back with his wife and children. Muthupandi's hotel was also bankrupt, and he lost everything. Muthupandi, with Ganga and Dhamu's support, brings out Meena and Manikkam. Manikkam opens a restaurant in front of Kandaswamy's restaurant. Muthupandi changes his father's restaurant into a bar while he was absent. Muthupandi's former henchmen blackmailed him to give them money. Back home, Kandaswamy is humiliated by his son and attempts to commit suicide. Muthupandi's former henchmen beat him, and he is taken hostage by them. Ganga and Dhamu then save Muthupandi, and the three of them apologize to Kandaswamy. They live happily together.

Cast

Napoleon as Manikkam
Roja as Meena
Vijayakumar as Kandaswamy
Charle as Ganga
Vaiyapuri as Dhamu
Kalpana as Jamuna
Kovai Sarala as Rani
Thalaivasal Vijay as Muthupandi
Shanmugasundari as Manikam's mother
Bonda Mani as Mani
Sonia as Muthupandi's wife
Kumarimuthu as Hotel server
 Bayilvan Ranganathan as Rowdy
Suryakanth as Rowdy
K.Rajan as Producer

Soundtrack

The film score and the soundtrack were composed by Deva. The soundtrack, released in 2001, features 5 tracks with lyrics written by Muthulingam, Kalidasan and Arivumathi. B. Balaji of Thenisai.com described the music as "above average".

Reception
S. R. Ashok Kumar of Hindu.com said : "too much of dialogue it makes the viewer restless at times". B. Balaji of Thenisai.com said : "the weak theme and even weaker handling make for uninteresting viewing".

References

Films scored by Deva (composer)
2001 films
2000s Tamil-language films
Films directed by V. Sekhar